Bahadurpur Rajoa is a village in Batala in Gurdaspur district of Punjab State, India. The village is administrated by Sarpanch an elected representative of the village.

Demography 
, The village has a total number of 459 houses and the population of 2305 of which 1187 are males while 1118 are females according to the report published by Census India in 2011. The literacy rate of the village is 64.66%, lower than the state average of 75.84%. The population of children under the age of 6 years is 299 which is 12.97% of total population of the village, and child sex ratio is approximately 769 lower than the state average of 846.

See also
List of villages in India

References 

Villages in Gurdaspur district